Edoardo Sonzogno (21 April 1836 – 14 March 1920) was an Italian publisher.

A native of Milan, Sonzogno was the son of a businessman who owned a printing plant and bookstore. When he inherited the business upon his father's death he set about turning it into a publishing house, Casa Sonzogno, which opened in 1874.  The company specialized in producing cheap editions of early Italian music, and became celebrated for its one-act opera contest, which began in 1883. Among the participants was Giacomo Puccini with Le Villi (1883) - who, in fact, did not win so that the opera was taken over by Giulio Ricordi, the competitor of Sonzogno. Pietro Mascagni's Cavalleria rusticana, submitted in 1889 and premiering in 1890, was by far the most famous opera to win the prize.

Sonzogno owned and directed the newspaper Il Secolo from 1861 until 1909. For much of that time, its editor was Ernesto Teodoro Moneta.

In 1894 he established a theater, the Lirico Internazionale, in Milan. He was also one of the first publishers in Italy to launch pocket-book editions of a huge range of classical authors from all over the world, a collection he called Biblioteca Universale. The price of these minibooks (11.5 x 17.5 cm) was so low, from 1 to 3.5 lire, that anybody could easily afford a personal library of classics, fiction and non-fiction.

Sonzogno died in Milan in 1920.

References
David Ewen, Encyclopedia of the Opera

1836 births
1920 deaths
Businesspeople from Milan
Italian music publishers (people)
Italian newspaper publishers (people)
Italian publishers (people)
Italian book publishers (people)